Three Women (3 Zan) is a 2008 Iranian drama film directed by Manijeh Hekmat.

Plot 
The film "Three Women" tells the story of a woman named Mino who is looking for her daughter.

Cast 
 Niki Karimi
 Pegah Ahangarani
 Nazanin Ahmadi
 Mehran Rajabi
 Atila Pesyani
 Reza Kianian
 Babak Hamidian
 Setareh Pesyani
 Shahrzad Kamalzadeh
 Maryam Boubani
 Saber Abar
 Ahmad Yavari Shad
 Mehrdad Ziaei
 Masume Eskandari
 Shiva Ebrahimi
 Khosro Ahmadi
 Ahmad Saatchian
 Satenik Babakhanian
 Shahrokh Forotanian
 Nasim Amirkhosro

Awards

References

External links

2008 films
Iranian drama films
2000s Persian-language films
Films directed by Manijeh Hekmat